<noinclude>

Persipura Jayapura U-20 is a professional football club based in Jayapura, Papua, Indonesia. The team nickname is "The Young Pearls" or Mutiara Muda. Persipura competes in the top division in Indonesian football. Persipura's stadium is known as the Mandala Stadium, which has a capacity of over 25,000 fans. The stadium is located near Dok 5 beach. The stadium is close to the local fishing village. To the east is Cyclops Mountains.

Stadium
Persipura Jayapura use Mandala Stadium as their home field. The stadium has a capacity of around 30,000 seats and still being renovated for 50,000 seat capacity. Mandala Stadium located in downtown Jayapura around Dok V, near the mouth of Humboldt Bay (otherwise known as Teluk Jayapura).

Notable former players
  Petra Tahalele (Senior team players and at the same time U-21 team players in 2007-09 and from 2009 until now he's just playing for the senior team only)
  Lukas Mandowen (promotion to main team in 2010)
  Titus Bonay (transfer to Bontang FC in winter 2009, play at Persiram in 2009-10 and now he came back to Persipura in 2010-11)
  David Laly (promotion to main team in 2009)
  Marco Kabiay (promotion to main team in 2010)
  Moses Banggo (promotion to main team in 2010)
  Alan Arthur Aronggear (transfer to Persiwa Wamena in 2009)
  Thomas Yulianto P. (move to Pelita Jaya U-21 in 2010)

All time top scorer

Achievements & honors
Liga Indonesia U-23
3rd Place (1): 2007
Indonesia Super League U-21
3rd Place (1): 2010
Indonesia Super League U-21
3rd Place (group stage): 2011
Indonesia Super League U-21
4th Place (1): 2012
Indonesia Super League U-21
3rd Place (1): 2013

Player honors 
Lukas Mandowen
Top Scorer: 2010

References

External links
 Official Persipura U-21 website
 Persipura Jayapura website

 
Football clubs in Indonesia